The San Antonio Valley AVA is an American Viticultural Area centered on San Antonio Valley, California in southern Monterey County, California.  The AVA was approved in July 2006 by the United States Department of the Treasury Alcohol and Tobacco Tax and Trade Bureau.

The area has one of the longest grape growing traditions in the present day United States, when the Mission San Antonio de Padua was established in 1771 with a small vineyard, in Spanish colonial  Las Californias.

The AVA is bordered to the east by the Salinas Valley, and on west by the Santa Lucia Mountains, with its typical warm climate benefiting from the cooling effects of nearby Lake San Antonio and the Pacific Ocean.

Overall, the AVA is similar in climate to the Paso Robles AVA and is likewise known for its Bordeaux and Rhône varietals.

References 

American Viticultural Areas of California
Geography of Monterey County, California
Santa Lucia Range
American Viticultural Areas
2006 establishments in California